Amazing Grace: Songs for Christmas is the first extended play (EP) by Australian recording artist Paulini, released on 26 November 2004 by Sony BMG Australia. The EP was produced by Audius Mtawarira and features cover versions of popular Christmas songs, as well as guest vocal appearances by Darlene Zschech and Human Nature. Amazing Grace: Songs for Christmas peaked at number 70 on the ARIA Albums Chart, and at number seven on the ARIA Urban Albums Chart.

Track listing

Charts
On 6 December 2004, the EP debuted at number 82 on the ARIA Albums Chart, and at number eight on the ARIA Urban Albums Chart. The following week, Amazing Grace: Songs for Christmas peaked at number 70 on the ARIA Albums Chart, and at number seven on the ARIA Urban Albums Chart.

Release history

References

Paulini albums
Sony Music Australia albums
2004 Christmas albums
Christmas albums by Australian artists
2004 debut EPs
Sony Music EPs